Dorn Gold Mine is a historic gold mine site located near McCormick in McCormick County, South Carolina.  The mine was struck in 1852, and exhausted in the late 1850s. It was operated by William Dorn, who excavated nearly $1,000,000 in gold during this period.  In 1869, the mine was sold to inventor Cyrus McCormick. In 1882, McCormick ended his futile search for gold and began selling his land which would become the town of McCormick.

It was listed on the National Register of Historic Places in 1985.

References

Buildings and structures on the National Register of Historic Places in South Carolina
Buildings and structures completed in 1852
Buildings and structures in McCormick County, South Carolina
National Register of Historic Places in McCormick County, South Carolina
1852 establishments in South Carolina